Kayla Jane Barron (née Sax; born September 19, 1987) is an American submarine warfare officer, engineer and NASA astronaut. Barron was selected in June 2017 as a member of the NASA Astronaut Group 22, and later qualified as an astronaut in 2020. Barron took part in her first spaceflight, SpaceX Crew-3, as part of the crew of Expedition 66/67, which launched to the International Space Station on November 10, 2021. Before joining NASA, Barron was a submarine warfare officer and Flag Aide to the Superintendent at the Naval Academy.

Early life and education 
Kayla Barron was born on September 19, 1987, in Pocatello, Idaho, to Lauri and Scott Sax. Her family moved to Richland, Washington, where she graduated from Richland High School in 2006. After high school, Barron attended the United States Naval Academy, where she graduated in 2010 with a Bachelor of Science degree in systems engineering. 

While at the Naval Academy, Barron was a member of the Midshipmen cross country and track teams. Following her graduation, Barron attended Peterhouse at the University of Cambridge on a Gates Cambridge Scholarship; she received here a Master of Philosophy degree in nuclear engineering in 2011. Motivated by a desire to address anthropogenic climate change, her graduate research focused on modeling the fuel cycle for a next-generation, thorium-fueled nuclear reactor concept known as an accelerator-driven subcritical reactor.

Military career 
After obtaining a master's degree, Barron was part of the first group of women to become submarine warfare officers. She attended the Navy's nuclear power and submarine officer training program, and was assigned to the Ohio-class submarine USS Maine. While serving on the USS Maine, Barron completed three patrols as a division officer. Following her submarine assignment, Barron was Flag Aide to the Superintendent at the Naval Academy until her selection as an astronaut.

NASA career 
In June 2017, Barron was selected as a member of NASA Astronaut Group 22, and began her two-year training. She was the fifth female Naval Academy graduate selected as an astronaut candidate.

She trained for the SpaceX Crew-3 mission, during which she worked aboard the International Space Station as a mission specialist. She launched on board the SpaceX Crew Dragon capsule Endurance on November 10, 2021, and served as part of the Expedition 67 long duration mission. Crew-3 landed in the Gulf of Mexico on May 6, 2022, after 176 days in space.

Personal life 
Barron is married to Tom Barron, a U.S. Army Special Forces officer. She enjoys hiking, backpacking, running, and reading.

Amateur radio 
Barron received a Technician Class amateur radio license from the FCC on September 21, 2020. Her call sign is KI5LAL.

Honors 
Barron was a Trident Scholar and Distinguished Graduate at the Naval Academy, and a Gates Cambridge Scholar at Cambridge.

Awards

Warfare insignia

Decorations and medals

NASA Astronaut Pin

References 

1987 births
Living people
United States Navy astronauts
People from Pocatello, Idaho
Female United States Navy officers
Women astronauts
Alumni of Peterhouse, Cambridge
Military personnel from Idaho
People from Richland, Washington
Navy Midshipmen women's track and field athletes
Navy Midshipmen women's cross country runners
United States Naval Academy alumni
SpaceX astronauts
Spacewalkers